Lee Min-ho (born 1987) is a South Korean actor and singer.

Lee Min-ho may also refer to:

 Boom (entertainer), stage name of Lee Min-ho (born 1982), South Korean rapper
 Lee Min-ho (baseball) (born 1993), South Korean baseball pitcher
 Lee Tae-ri, stage name of Lee Min-ho (born 1993), South Korean actor